Hilliardston is an unincorporated community in Nash County, North Carolina, United States.

Notes

Unincorporated communities in Nash County, North Carolina
Unincorporated communities in North Carolina